Lotus TV Macau, owned by Macau Lotus TV Media via Satélite, Limitada, is a Macanese satellite TV channel broadcast via satellite through Apstar 7.

It mainly offers movies, cultural, news and interview programmes.

History
Launched at 28 October 2002, it was granted permission to become a Macau satellite TV licensing company at 1 December 2008 by the Macau government.

See also
 Media of Macau

References

External links
Official Site (Chinese)

Television networks in China
Mass media in Macau
Television in Macau
2002 establishments in Macau
Television channels and stations established in 2002